Cratera cryptolineata is a species of land planarian found in Brazil.

Description 
The color of the dorsum is homogeneously dark brown with a thin median stripe occurring along the body that is only visible under the stereomicroscope. The ventral side is light brown.

The several eyes of C. cryptolineata are distributed marginally in the first millimeters of the body and posteriorly become dorsal, occupying around one third of the body width.

Etymology 
The specific epithet cryptolineata comes from Greek κρυπτός (kryptos), hidden + Latin lineata, striped, and refers to the thin media stripe visible under the stereomicroscope.

Distribution 
Cratera cryptolineata is known only from the Três Barras National Forest, Santa Catarina, Brazil.

References 

Geoplanidae
Invertebrates of Brazil